Meri Maa may refer to:

 Meri Maa (Indian TV series), a 2011–2012 Indian television drama series which aired on Life OK
 Meri Maa (Pakistani TV series), a 2013–2015 Pakistani television drama series that aired on Geo TV
 Ganga Meri Maa, 1983 Indian film